St Botolph's Church may refer to numerous churches in England, including:

St Botolph's Church in Aspley Guise, Central Bedfordshire
St Botolph's Church in Bossall, North Yorkshire
St Botolph's Church, Boston, Lincolnshire
St Botolph's Church, Botolphs, West Sussex
St Botolph's Church, Cambridge, Cambridgeshire 
St Botolph's Church, Hardham, West Sussex
St Botolph's Church, Heene, West Sussex
St Botolph's Church in Iken, Suffolk
St Botolph's Church, Lullingstone, Kent
St Botolph's Church in Newbold-on-Avon, Warwickshire
St Botolph's Church in North Cove, East Suffolk
St Botolph's Church, Quarrington, Lincolnshire
St Botolph's Church, Ratcliffe on the Wreake, Leicestershire
St Botolph's Church, Shepshed, Leicestershire
St Botolph's Church, Skidbrooke,  Lincolnshire
St Botolph's Church in Trunch, Norfolk
St Botolph's Church, Wardley, Rutland

Churches in London 
St Botolph's, Aldersgate
St Botolph's Aldgate
St Botolph Billingsgate
St Botolph-without-Bishopsgate
St Botolph's Church, Ruxley, London Borough of Bromley

See also
St. Botolph's Priory, Colchester, Essex
Budolfi Church, Aalborg, Jutland, Denmark